Runzhou District is one of three districts of Zhenjiang, Jiangsu province, China.

To the east of Runzhou lies the Grand Canal and Jingkou District with Zhenjiang New District to the southeast.  The district has an area of 132.68 km2. By the end of 2004, the total population was 237,100 people.

Administrative divisions
In the present, Runzhou District has 7 subdistricts.
7 subdistricts

References

External links 

County-level divisions of Jiangsu
Zhenjiang
Runzhou District